Gynacantha kirbyi is a species of dragonfly in the family Aeshnidae, 
known as the slender duskhawker. 
It is found in northern Queensland, Australia,
the Maluku Islands, Tanimbar and New Guinea.

Gynacantha kirbyi is a large, dull-coloured dragonfly with a strongly constricted waist in its abdomen at segment 3. Wings of the female have a brown colouring near their base. It is a crepuscular insect and flies at dawn and dusk.

Gallery

See also
 List of Odonata species of Australia

References

Aeshnidae
Odonata of Australia
Insects of New Guinea
Taxa named by Leopold Krüger
Insects described in 1898